Orta Zəyzid (also, Orta Zəyzit and Orta-Zəyzit) is a village and municipality in the Shaki Rayon of Azerbaijan.  It has a population of 4,644. A big scale modern dairy farm operates in the territory of the village, located by Shaki-Oguz Road.

References 

Populated places in Shaki District